There have been two baronetcies created for persons with the surname Hayes, one in the Baronetage of Ireland and one in the Baronetage of Great Britain. Both creations are extinct.

The Hayes Baronetcy, of Drumboe Castle in the County of Donegal, was created in the Baronetage of Ireland on 27 August 1789 for Samuel Hayes, who represented Augher in the Irish House of Commons between 1783 and 1790. The third Baronet represented County Donegal in the British House of Commons. The title became extinct on the death of the fifth Baronet in 1912.

The Hayes Baronetcy, of Westminster, London, was created in the Baronetage of Great Britain on 6 February 1797 for John Hayes, a military physician and Physician-Extraordinary to the Prince of Wales. The title became extinct on the death of the third Baronet in 1896.

Hayes baronets, of Drumboe Castle (1789)

Sir Samuel Hayes, 1st Baronet (1737–1807)
Sir Samuel Hayes, 2nd Baronet (1773–1827)
Sir Edmund Samuel Hayes, 3rd Baronet (1806–1860)
Sir Samuel Hercules Hayes, 4th Baronet (1840–1901)
Sir Edmund Francis Hayes, 5th Baronet (1850–1912)

Hayes baronets, of Westminster (1797)

Sir John Macnamara Hayes, 1st Baronet (1750–1809)
Sir Thomas Pelham Hayes, 2nd Baronet (1794–1851)
Sir John Warren Hayes, 3rd Baronet (1799–1896) Baronetcy became extinct after his death. 
Capt. John Beauchamp Hayes (b. 1849 – d. 1884) married on 1878 Julia Annie (d. 1906) daughter of Henry Hibbert Hopkins, of Guilsborough Grange, Northamptonshire. 
Annie Ellen, married on 1904 Ernest Basil Williams Miller.
Lucy Isabel, married on 1908 Arthur Leigh Brown.
Marguerite, married on 1904 Charles Thistlethwayte Welman Dunsmure.

References

Extinct baronetcies in the Baronetage of Ireland
Extinct baronetcies in the Baronetage of Great Britain
1789 establishments in Ireland